Jeanne Louise Henriette Campan (née Genet; 6 October 1752, Paris 16 March 1822, Mantes) was a French educator, writer and Lady's maid. In the service of Marie Antoinette before and during the French Revolution, she was afterwards headmistress of the first "Maison d'éducation de la Légion d'honneur", as appointed by Napoleon in 1807 to promote the education of girls.

Biography 

She was the daughter of Edme-Jacques Genet and Marie-Anne-Louise Cardon. Her father was the highest-ranking clerk in the foreign office (the ambassador Citizen Genet was her younger brother), and, although without fortune, placed her in the most cultivated society. By the age of fifteen she could speak English and Italian, and had gained so high a reputation for her academic accomplishments as to be appointed reader to Louis XV's daughters (Mesdames Victoire, Sophie and Louise) in 1768, and Femme de chambre to Marie Antoinette in 1770.

She was a general favourite at court, and when in 1774 she bestowed her hand upon Pierre-Dominique-François Berthollet Campan, son of the secretary of the royal cabinet, the king gave her an annuity of 5,000 livres as dowry. The marriage was unhappy and the couple separated in 1790. Campan was promoted to Première femme de Chambre by Marie Antoinette in 1786; and she continued to attend on her until the 10 August 1792 storming of the Tuileries Palace, in which she was left behind in the palace when the queen and the royal family left prior to the storming. With her own house pillaged and burned that day, Henriette sought asylum in the countryside.

She survived the Reign of Terror, but after the 9th of Thermidor, finding herself almost penniless, and being thrown on her own resources by the illness of her spouse, Campan determined to support herself by in 1794 establishing a school at Saint-Germain-en-Laye. The institution prospered, and was patronized by Hortense de Beauharnais, whose influence led to the appointment of Campan as superintendent of the academy founded by Napoleon at Écouen for the education of the orphaned daughters of members of his Légion d'honneur in 1807. She held this post until it was abolished at the restoration of the Bourbons in 1814, when she retired to Mantes, where she spent the rest of her life amid the kind attentions of friends, but saddened by the loss of her only son, and by the calumnies circulated on account of her connection with the Bonapartes.

Legacy
Henriette Campan died in 1822, leaving valuable Memoirs of the Private Life of Marie Antoinette (published 1823 (posthumously), Paris, 3 vols.), subtitled To which are Added Personal Recollections Illustrative of the Reigns of Louis XIV, Louis XV, and Louis XVI; a treatise De l'Education des Femmes (pub. 1824); and one or two small didactic works, written in a clear and natural style. The most noteworthy thing in her educational system, and that which especially recommended it to Napoleon, was the place given to domestic economy in the education of girls. At Écouen the pupils underwent a complete training in all branches of housework.

Quotes

References

Attribution
.

Further reading
 Fitton, Mary. The Faithful Servant: Jeanne Louise Henriette Campan, 1752-1822 (1965).
 Scott, Barbara. "Madame Campan, 1752-1822" History Today (Oct 1973), Vol. 23 Issue 10, pp 683–690 online.

External links
 
  
 Memoirs Of Marie Antoinette at Gutenberg

1752 births
1822 deaths
18th-century French educators
18th-century French women writers
18th-century French writers
19th-century French educators
19th-century French women writers
Ancien Régime office-holders
Education writers
Heads of schools in France
French courtiers
French memoirists
People of the French Revolution
French women memoirists
Household of Marie Antoinette
19th-century women educators
Maids
18th-century memoirists